Béoumi is a town in central Ivory Coast. It is a sub-prefecture of and the seat of Béoumi Department in Gbêkê Region, Vallée du Bandama District. Béoumi is also a commune.

In 2021, the population of the sub-prefecture of Béoumi was 85,600.

Villages
The 54 villages of the sub-prefecture of Béoumi and their population in 2014 are:

Notable people
Sidi Tiémoko Touré, Minister of Animal and Fisheries Resources

Notes

Sub-prefectures of Gbêkê
Communes of Gbêkê